Jim Morrison Varela Devotto (born 16 October 1994) is a Uruguayan footballer who plays as a defensive midfielder for C.A. Rentistas.

Club career
Born in Montevideo, Varela joined Peñarol youth ranks at age 12. The  or  midfielder, depending on sources, made his professional debut for Penãrol in the 2010–11 Primera División and also making part of the squad that won the 2012–13 Uruguayan Primera División.

Varela joined S.L. Benfica in July 2013, being initially loaned to Farense. In early September 2014, he went on tryouts at Real Murcia. On 21 January 2015, Varela joined Rampla Juniors on loan. On 31 August 2015, Varela returned to Benfica.

On 10 May 2016, Varela joined Brazilian club Sport Club São Paulo from Rio Grande, Rio Grande do Sul.

International career
Varela was part of Uruguay U-17 team that took competed in the 2011 FIFA U-17 World Cup in Mexico, playing five matches, with the Uruguyan team finishing in second place. He also played once for the Uruguay U20 in the 2013 FIFA U-20 World Cup in Turkey.

References

External links
 
 
 

1994 births
Living people
Footballers from Montevideo
Uruguayan footballers
Association football midfielders
Peñarol players
S.L. Benfica B players
S.C. Farense players
Rampla Juniors players
Sport Club São Paulo players
Atenas de San Carlos players
Juventud de Las Piedras players
Chacarita Juniors footballers
Racing Club de Montevideo players
C.A. Rentistas players
Liga Portugal 2 players
Uruguayan Primera División players
Uruguayan Segunda División players
Primera Nacional players
Uruguay under-20 international footballers
Uruguayan expatriate footballers
Expatriate footballers in Portugal
Expatriate footballers in Brazil
Expatriate footballers in Argentina
Uruguayan expatriate sportspeople in Portugal
Uruguayan expatriate sportspeople in Brazil
Uruguayan expatriate sportspeople in Argentina